After Lucia is a 2012 Mexican drama film directed by Michel Franco. The film competed in the Un Certain Regard section at the 2012 Cannes Film Festival where it won the top prize. The film was also selected as the Mexican entry for the Best Foreign Language Oscar at the 85th Academy Awards, but it did not make the final shortlist. The style of the film has been described as being influenced by Austrian director Michael Haneke.

Plot
Roberto is depressed after his wife, Lucía, dies in a road accident. He decides to leave Puerto Vallarta and move to Mexico City with his 17-year-old daughter, Alejandra.  Settling into her new school, Alejandra goes to a party one night with her classmates.  At the party, she has sex with José, who films the encounter on his phone.  The next day the footage has been circulated around the school, with Alejandra getting text messages calling her a slut. This provides an excuse for fellow students to bully and sexually harass her. She  does not speak of these incidents to anyone.

The school organises a trip to Veracruz which all students must attend.  At the resort, each room is shared by groups of four.  Alejandra is bullied again into going into the shower by her female roommates. They then block the door of the bathroom. At night, while the rest of the students enjoy a party in the main room, the boys take turns to enter the bathroom and rape her.

The students then go to the beach to continue the party. When it ends, Alejandra is asleep on the beach as one of the boys urinates on her.  One of the female students suggests she should go into the sea to wash herself. The rest join her and they have fun in the water. Alejandra disappears and the rest become anxious about repercussions.  The next morning, the teachers discover she is missing and alert her father.  He finds out about the bullying and is frustrated when the police cannot take action, as the crimes have been committed by minors.

Unbeknown to everyone, Alejandra is safe in a building where she went to sleep.  Meanwhile, her father follows a car driven by José's father and kidnaps José after his father went to park his car.  He ties Jose's hands behind his back and gags him.  He drives to the coast where he hires a boat and takes José out to sea where he throws him overboard, before starting the engine again and continuing to ride in the sea.

Cast
 Tessa Ía González Norvind as Alejandra
 Hernán Mendoza as Roberto
 Gonzalo Vega Sisto as José
 Tamara Yazbek Bernal as Tamara
 Paloma Cervantes as Irene
 Juan Carlos Barranco as Manuel
 Francisco Rueda as Javier
 Diego Canales

Accolades

See also
 List of submissions to the 85th Academy Awards for Best Foreign Language Film
 List of Mexican submissions for the Academy Award for Best Foreign Language Film

References

External links
 

2012 films
2012 drama films
2010s Spanish-language films
Mexican drama films
Films about bullying
Films about school violence
Films directed by Michel Franco
Films set in Mexico City
2010s Mexican films